Tajuria ister, the uncertain royal, is a butterfly in the family Lycaenidae. It is found in Asia.

Subspecies
Tajuria ister ister (Assam, Burma, possibly Thailand)
Tajuria ister tussis Druce, 1895 (Peninsular Malaya, Borneo, possibly Sumatra)

References

Butterflies described in 1865
Tajuria
Butterflies of Borneo
Butterflies of Asia
Taxa named by William Chapman Hewitson